is a railway station in the city of Yamagata, Yamagata Prefecture, Japan, operated by East Japan Railway Company (JR East).

Lines
Yamadera Station is served by the Senzan Line, and is located 48.7 rail kilometers from the terminus of the line at Sendai Station.

Station layout
The station has a single island platform connected to the station building by a footbridge. The station building is designed to resemble a Buddhist temple. The station has a Midori no Madoguchi staffed ticket office

Platforms

History
Yamadera Station opened on October 17, 1933. The station was absorbed into the JR East network upon the privatization of JNR on April 1, 1987.

Passenger statistics
In fiscal 2018, the station was used by an average of 531 passengers daily (boarding passengers only).

Surrounding area
Yama-dera

See also
List of railway stations in Japan

References

External links

 JR East Station information 

Stations of East Japan Railway Company
Railway stations in Yamagata Prefecture
Senzan Line
Railway stations in Japan opened in 1933
Yamagata, Yamagata